Mostafa Mohamed Ahmed Abdallah (born 28 November 1997) is an Egyptian professional footballer who plays as a striker for French  club Nantes, on loan from Süper Lig club Galatasaray, and the Egypt national team.

Club career

Zamalek 
He starts playing at the age of 11 with Zamalek.

On 2 January 2020, Mohamed scored a goal in the 42nd minute for Zamalek against Aswan in the 11th round of the Egyptian League. On 28 January 2020, Mohamed scored a long-range goal in the 15th minute against Wadi Degla, which ended in a 1–1 draw.

Galatasaray 
On 1 February 2021, Süper Lig club Galatasaray signed Mohamed on a one-and-a-half-year loan for a reported fee of $2 million, with an option to buy for $4 million. He became the first Egyptian to sign for the Istanbul-based club.

Mohamed scored on his debut on 2 February, coming on as a 46th minute substitute in a 3–0 Süper Lig win against İstanbul Başakşehir; he scored his side's third goal from a penalty. In his second game for Galatasaray, he scored the only goal in a 1–0 away win against Fenerbahçe in the 54th minute on 6 February.

On 27 December 2021, Galatasaray activated his redemption clause and he signed until 2025.

Nantes (loan) 
In the notification made by Galatasaray on 21 July 2022, it was announced that Mohammed was rented to the French Nantes club for one year. On 28 August 2022, he scored his first Ligue 1 goal in a 3–1 win over Toulouse. On 8 September 2022, he scored his first goal in European competitions in a 2–1 win over Olympiacos in the Europa League.
After having failed to score in subsequent European competition matches, he returned to scoring on 3 November in the second leg against Olympiacos. With his goal he help Nantes to reach the knockout round play-offs against Juventus.

On 7 January 2023 Mohamed made his debut in Coupe de France against AF Virois, scoring his first gol in the competition. He help his team also in the next round agains ES Thaon.

International career

Youth 
Mohamed has played for both the Egypt U-20 team and the Egypt U-23 team, representing Egypt in the 2019 Africa U-23 Cup of Nations, scoring Egypt's opening goal of a 1–0 win over Mali in the group stage. He went on to score in his following two matches, one goal in a 3–2 win over Ghana, and two goals in a 2–1 win over Cameroon, with Egypt winning their first title by defeating Ivory Coast 2–1 in the final. Mohamed earned the tournament's golden boot.

Senior 
On 23 March 2019, Mohamed made his debut for the Egypt national team in the Africa Cup of Nations qualification, in a 1–1 away draw against Niger. On 5 September 2021, he scored his first senior international goal in a 1–1 draw against Gabon in 2022 FIFA World Cup qualification.

Personal life 
On 10 June 2020, Mohamed celebrated his wedding with his wife Hayat Salama.

Career statistics

Club

International 

Scores and results list Egypt's goal tally first.

Honours 

Zamalek
 Egyptian Premier League: 2020–21
 Egypt Cup: 2018–19
 Egyptian Super Cup: 2019–20
 CAF Super Cup: 2020

Egypt
 Africa Cup of Nations runner-up: 2021

Egypt U23
 Africa U-23 Cup of Nations: 2019

Individual
 Africa U-23 Cup of Nations Golden Boot: 2019

References

External links

 
 
 
 
 
 

1997 births
Living people
Sportspeople from Giza
Egyptian footballers
Association football forwards
Zamalek SC players
Tanta SC players
Galatasaray S.K. footballers
FC Nantes players
Egyptian Premier League players
Süper Lig players
Egyptian expatriate footballers
Expatriate footballers in Turkey
Egyptian expatriate sportspeople in Turkey
Expatriate footballers in France
Egyptian expatriate sportspeople in France
Egypt international footballers
2021 Africa Cup of Nations players